Bruiu is a commune located in Sibiu County, Transylvania, Romania. It is composed of three villages: Bruiu, Gherdeal (Gürteln; Gerdály) and Șomartin (Martinsberg; Mártonhegy). Each of these has a fortified church.

Architecture

Built by the local Transylvanian Saxon community, the village church was first attested in 1307. Initially built as a Romanesque basilica, it was transformed in the 15th century, when Gothic elements were added.

References

Augustin Ioan, Hanna Derer. The Fortified Churches of the Transylvanian Saxons. Noi Media Print, 2004 

Communes in Sibiu County
Localities in Transylvania